Jeffrey or Jeff Thomas may refer to:
 Jeff Thomas (boxer) (born 1981), British professional boxer
 Jeff Thomas (cricketer) (born 1971), Australian cricketer
 Jeff Thomas (curler) (born 1954), Canadian curler and coach
 Jeff Thomas (footballer) (born 1949), Welsh footballer for Newport County
 Jeff Thomas (photographer) (born 1956), Canadian photographer
 Jeff Thomas (wide receiver) (born 1998), American football wide receiver
 Jeff T. Thomas, music video and television director
 Jeffrey Thomas (actor), Welsh actor and writer
 Jeffrey Thomas (musician), artistic director of the American Bach Soloists
 Jeffrey Thomas (politician) (1933–1989), British politician
 Jeffrey Thomas (writer) (born 1957), American horror and science fiction writer
 Jeffrey C. Thomas (1940–2009), American perennial candidate for political office

See also 
 Geoffrey Thomas (disambiguation)